FESCO Transportation Group is an intermodal transport operator in Russia, which provides services, including marine shipping, Roll-on/roll-off, rail transportation and port handling. The parent company of the Group is Far-Eastern Shipping Company JSC. FESCO Group is headquartered in Moscow.

Share capital and management

The base company of the group is the Far-Eastern Shipping Company (FESCO). The company was founded in Vladivostok in 1880.

Current shareholding structure is: Mr. Magomedov – 32.5%; entities controlled by Mr. Garber (is one of the controlling shareholders of GHP Group) – 23.8%, TPG – 17.4%, other shareholders/Free float – 26.3%. The chairman of the executive board of FESCO Transportation Group is Leyla Mammad Zada, the president is Alexander Isurin.

On 13 December 2012, Summa Group and GHP Group indirectly acquired 49.99% and 23.75% of the shares of FESCO, respectively. The acquisition was funded by a mixture of debt and equity.  In December 2012, TPG joined in Summa Group's investment in FESCO, as a result of which TPG has certain rights in respect of oversight of the FESCO business and an indirect economic ownership interest of 17.5% in the Group.

Business  
The majority of the company's operations are located in the Russian Far East. FESCO operations are handled by five divisions, namely Port, Rail, Liner and Logistics, Shipping, and Bunkering.

Cooperation highlights and joint ventures

The 100% FESCO subsidiary Transgarant and Russkaya Troyka (50% joint venture with the RZhD).

In 2011, the Bremen-based BLG Group and FESCO founded a joint venture for logistics for the Russian automotive industry.

Gallery

See also

 MV Lyubov Orlova – ghost ship formerly owned by FESC.

References

External links
FESCO Transportation Group

Companies listed on the Moscow Exchange
Russian brands
Container shipping companies
Companies established in 1880
Shipping companies of Russia
Companies based in Moscow
Shipping companies of the Soviet Union
Car carrier shipping companies
Ro-ro shipping companies